Timothy R. Madden was a member of the Massachusetts House of Representatives for the Barnstable, Dukes and Nantucket district. Madden was succeeded by Dylan Fernandes.

Prior to becoming a state representative, Madden served as a Nantucket Selectman, Chairman of the Land Bank Commission, Chairman of the Harbor Planning Committee, Town Meeting Moderator, and as a member of County Commission, Planning & Economic Development Commission, member of the Board of Health, Zoning Board, and Town & County Charter Committee.

References

Democratic Party members of the Massachusetts House of Representatives
People from Nantucket, Massachusetts
Living people
21st-century American politicians
Year of birth missing (living people)